A jaunting car is a light two-wheeled carriage for a single horse, with a seat in front for the driver. In its most common form with seats for two or four persons placed back to back, with the foot-boards projecting over the wheels and the typical conveyance for persons in Ireland at one time (outside jaunting car). Also with passenger seats facing each other (inside jaunting car)

The first part of the term is generally taken to be identical with the verb to jaunt, now only used in the sense of to go on a short pleasure excursion, but in its earliest uses meaning to make a horse caracole or prance, hence to jolt or bump up and down. It would apparently be a variant of "jaunce", of the same meaning, which is supposed to be taken from old French .

Ireland

In rural Ireland it was adapted for public transport by the Anglo-Irish entrepreneur Charles Bianconi in 1815. It was also a popular mode of transport in 19th-century Dublin, popularised by Valentine Vousden in a song by that name. Jaunting cars remain in use for tourists in some parts of the country, notably Killarney in County Kerry where tours of the lakes and national park are popular. 

The colloquial name for the Irish driver of a jaunting car was "jarvey", used in the song "The Jarvey Was a Leprechaun" by Val Doonican. Percy French edited a weekly comic magazine called The Jarvey from January 1889-January 1891 based on the adventures of a driver of The Irish Jaunting Car and published by Richard J. Mecredy who was also publisher and editor of highly successful  Irish Cyclist. The Jarvey was a highly literary and lavishly illustrated weekly comic paper, considered to have been the best comic paper of the 19th and 20th century in Ireland. French also wrote his own version of the song 'The Irish Jaunting Car' for his comic opera 'The Knight of the Road.' (1891)

Elsewhere
When William Wordsworth toured Scotland in 1803 with his sister Dorothy and friend Samuel Taylor Coleridge, Coleridge procured an Irish jaunting car for the journey from a friend in Somerset, England.  Managing the horse and car proved difficult for Wordsworth, who had appointed himself as the driver.

Types

There were two main varieties of jaunting car: the "outside jaunting car", or "outside car", the more common type described above, in which the passengers faced outward over the wheels, and 
the "inside jaunting car", or "inside car", considered to be more "genteel", in which the passengers sat with their backs to the sides of the car and faced each other.  Anthony Trollope described the "inside jaunting-car" as "perhaps the most uncomfortable kind of vehicle yet invented." 

A third variety, the "covered car", was an inside car with oiled canvas arranged on all sides to protect the passengers from the weather, at the expense of visibility.

Taxation
In the early 1800s, the British government levied a tax on every "jaunting car or pleasure car" (1813 Act of Parliament, 53 Geo III c.59).

In film
This form of vehicle also featured in the 1952 movie The Quiet Man, particularly to comedic effect during the first formal courting scene involving the characters played by John Wayne, Maureen O'Hara, and Barry Fitzgerald.

In Disney's 1967 film The Gnome-Mobile, DJ Mulroony (Walter Brennan) tells his grandchildren (Matthew Garber and  Karen Dotrice) about the jaunting car he owned in his youth, and sings a song about it.

Notes

References

External links

Carts